Alexandros "Alekos" Petroulas (Greek: Αλέξανδρος "Αλέκος" Πέτρουλας; born June 2, 1978) is a Greek professional basketball player. At a height of 2.02 m (6' 7") tall, he can play at both the power forward and center positions.

Professional career
During his professional club career, Petroulas has played with some of the following Greek clubs: Esperos Kallitheas, Peristeri, Ilysiakos, Makedonikos, Panellinios, Psychiko, Aetos, and Panelefsiniakos.

External links
EuroCup Profile
Eurobasket.com Profile
Greek Basket League Profile 

Living people
1978 births
Centers (basketball)
Esperos B.C. players
Greek men's basketball players
Greek Basket League players
Ilysiakos B.C. players
Makedonikos B.C. players
Panelefsiniakos B.C. players
Panellinios B.C. players
Peristeri B.C. players
Power forwards (basketball)
Psychiko B.C. players
Small forwards
Basketball players from Athens